Miss Venezuela 1975 was the 22nd edition of Miss Venezuela pageant held at Poliedro de Caracas in Caracas, Venezuela, on June 25, 1975.  The winner of the pageant was Maritza Pineda, Miss Nueva Esparta.

The pageant was broadcast live by Venevision from the Poliedro, marking the first of many to be held in this stadium.

Results
Miss Venezuela 1975 - Maritza Pineda (Miss Nueva Esparta)
1st runner-up - María Conchita Alonso (Miss Distrito Federal)
2nd runner-up - Yamel Diaz (Miss Carabobo)
3rd runner-up - Helena Merlin (Miss Barinas)
4th runner-up - Virginia Sipl (Miss Amazonas)

Special awards
 Miss Fotogénica (Miss Photogenic) - Maritzabel Gruber (Miss Monagas)
 Miss Simpatía (Miss Congeniality) - Yamel Díaz (Miss Carabobo)
 Miss Amistad (Miss Friendship) - Mildred Galicia (Miss Falcón)

Delegates

Miss Amazonas - Virginia Sipl Raucher
Miss Anzoátegui - Yuraima Vargas
Miss Aragua - Migdalia Ramírez
Miss Barinas - Helena Françoise Merlin Scher
Miss Bolívar - Aracelia Ordaz
Miss Carabobo - Yamel Díaz Rodríguez
Miss Departamento Vargas - Carol Ann Pohudka Parilli
Miss Distrito Federal - María Conchita Alonso Bustillo
  Miss Falcón - Mildred Galicia Vargas
Miss Lara - Yubisay Pacheco Villavicencio
Miss Miranda  - Thamara Piña
Miss Monagas - Maritzabel Grúver
Miss Nueva Esparta - Maritza Pineda Montoya
Miss Sucre - Marianella Torrealba Briceño
Miss Zulia - Ligia Matilde Barboza Quintero

References

External links
Miss Venezuela official website

1975 beauty pageants
1975 in Venezuela